FK Prespa is a football club based in Resen, Republic of North Macedonia. They are currently competing in the Macedonian Third League (Southwest Division)

History
The club was founded in 1919.

External links 
Prespa Sport 
Club info at MacedonianFootball 
Club info at MakFudbal 
Football Federation of Macedonia 

Football clubs in North Macedonia
FK Prespa
Association football clubs established in 1919
1919 establishments in Yugoslavia